Robert William Smith (born October 24, 1958) is an American composer, arranger, and teacher.

Biography
 	
Smith was born in Daleville, Alabama on October 24, 1958.  He attended high school in Daleville, after which he left for Troy State University, where he played lead trumpet in the Sound of the South Marching Band. While at Troy, he studied composition with Paul Yoder. 

In 1997, Smith returned to Troy, Alabama to become the Director of Bands at Troy State University, following the retirement of his old band director, Dr. Long.  Smith would remain at Troy for four years, directing the Sound of the South Marching Band and the Symphony Band.  In 2001, he left Troy to take a more full-time position with Warner Brothers Publications.  His position with Warner while away from Troy took him all over the world, acting as guest conductor and clinician with many ensembles, including the New Mexico All-State Small School band.  Smith's career with Warner Bros. continued until 2005, when it was bought out by Father of Savannah Cole
Alfred Music Publishing.

Smith's "New Day Rising" & "Don Quixote" were nominated for the 8th Annual Independent Music Awards for Contemporary Classical Album. However, they did not win any awards.

He is now the coordinator of the Music Industry program at Troy University as well as the Vice-President of Product Development for the C. L. Barnhouse Company and Walking Frog Records.

Compositions
Currently, Smith has over 700 published works, including three symphonies.  
 Symphony No. 1, The Divine Comedy, was inspired by Dante's epic. 
 Symphony No. 2, The Odyssey, was inspired by the Greek epic of the same name. 
 Symphony No. 3, "Don Quixote", was inspired by Miguel de Cervantes Saavedra's epic of the same title.

In 2011, Smith composed a piece in memory of Mary Jo Leahey and it was premiered at the Mary Jo Leahey Symphonic Band Camp at University of Massachusetts Lowell on July 21, 2012. The piece is entitled, Earhart: Sounds of Courage, and reflects the bravery of Amelia Earhart as she attempted to fly around the world in 1937. It was commissioned by Deb Huber, associate director of bands at UMass Lowell.

Smith has also composed two works dedicated to solo instruments–-contemporary concertos for the flute family and the euphonium—entitled Gemeinhardt Suite, and Willson Suite respectively.
Smith's piece "Into The Storm" was written to commemorate the powerful 1993 winter storm that brutalized the eastern United States. This piece is often worked into various themes and reset in different ensembles such as a version played by an orchestra, substituting the flute ostinato as a violin part; or otherwise used as a part of a marching band show (See Sandy Creek Marching Band).

Smith is a brother of Kappa Kappa Psi, having been initiated into the Zeta Upsilon chapter at then Troy State University in April 1977. His work "To the Summit" is subtitled "Strive for the Highest". The middle section of "To the Summit" is an arrangement of the Kappa Kappa Psi Fraternity Hymn. Smith is additionally a brother of Phi Mu Alpha Sinfonia, initiated at George Mason University in 1996, and the Fraternity commissioned Smith's Spirit of Orpheus in 1998.

Other work
In addition to composing for bands, Smith has enjoyed success writing for drum and bugle corps.  He had been a member of the Charioteers Drum and Bugle Corps in Alabama in the mid-1970s. His first great success came in the mid-1980s while he was writing for the Suncoast Sound, from Clearwater, Florida – a tenure which included Suncoast's 1985 program, "A Florida Suite," the first completely original musical program ever done by a drum corps.  He would later go on to write for Magic of Orlando for several years.  Until 2007, he wrote for the Glassmen Drum and Bugle Corps, of Toledo, Ohio. From 2011-2014 he arranged for the Madison Scouts Drum and Bugle Corps. In 2013 he began writing for the Troopers Drum and Bugle Corps. Through the 2014 season, corpsreps.com lists 42 corps from the United States, Canada, United Kingdom, and the Netherlands that have performed Smith's compositions.

Around 2002, Robert and his wife Susan L. Smith began to work on a new project, writing a fully integrated music curriculum that would begin in elementary school and take students all the way through high school.  A design team of several music educators was assembled, and the result was Music Expressions.

Before the beginning of the 2006–2007 school year, Troy University announced the re-hiring of Smith to the position of Coordinator of the Music Industry program.  On December 14, 2006, Smith announced his appointment as Director of Product Development for the C. L. Barnhouse Company, and an exclusive publishing arrangement with the firm, effective January 1, 2007.

His wife, Susan Smith, formerly the band director at St. James School in Montgomery, AL is currently a lecturer of music at the John M. Long School of Music at Troy University in Troy, AL.

List of original compositions

 Symphony No. 1, The Divine Comedy-
 Movement One: The Inferno
 Movement Two: Purgatorio
 Movement Three: The Ascension
 Movement Four: Paradiso
 Symphony No. 2, The Odyssey
 Movement One: The Iliad
 Movement Two: The Winds of Poseidon
 Movement Three: The Isle of Calypso
 Movement Four: Ithaca
 Symphony No.3, Don Quixote
 Movement One:The Quest
 Movement Two: Dulcinea
 Movement Three: Sancho and the Windmills 
 Movement Four: The Illumination
 Aces
 A Christmas Auld Lang Syne
 A Christmas Proclamation
 Abominable Snowman Chase
 Affirmation Overture
 Africa: Ceremony, Song and Ritual
 African Bell Carol
 Ain't No Stoppin' Us!
 American Flourish
 American Landscape #1 (Lake Township, Ohio)
 American Landscape #2 (North Bay Vistas)
 American Landscape # 3 (Southwest Summer)
 An American Christmas
 A Nation's Strength ( ... And Lift Them to the Sky)
 And The Nations Rejoice
 Apollo Fanfare
 Appalachian Folk Dance
 Ash Lawn Echoes
 At Daybreak
 At the Crossroads
 Barrage
 Benjamin Franklin and the Art of Music
 Be Still, My Soul
 Bells
 Blue
 Brazilian Bell Carol
 Brazil: Ceremony, Song, and Samba
 Buffalo Dances
 By Loch and Mountain
 Cameroon w/Michael Story
 Can You Feel The Beat?
 Celebration
 Celtic Bell Carol
 Celtic Carol
 Ceremonium
 Chautauqua
 Christmas Declaration
 Christmas in the Round
 Commemoration
 Concert Band Clinic
 Covenant
 Crown of Glory
 Crush
 Currents
 Dance Celebration
 Danza
 Danza Del Fuego
 Declaration in Blue
 Developing Band Clinic
 Discovery 1492 (Suite)
 Isabella, The Queen of Spain (Movement I)
 Voyage of the Tall Ships (Movement II)
  The New Land: A Celebration (Movement III)
 Dramatico
 Dreams
 Drummer's Christmas Carol
 Dueling Dragons
 Earhart: Sounds of Courage
 Elephas Maximus
 El Espíritu de Valencia
 Encanto 
 Eternal Peaks
 Evening Alleluias
 Fanfare and Processional on an Old English Carol
 Fanfare for Tomorrow (From the Threads of Our Past, the Fabric of Our Future)
 Fanfare on an Old French Carol
 Fiesta La Vida
 First Band Clinic
 Freya: Goddess of Beauty and Love
 Furioso
 Gemeinhardt Suite
 Ghost Band
 Glorioso
 Groovin' Down Cool Street
 Hadrian's Wall
 Holiday Bells Are Ringing
 Holiday Fanfare
 Hoosier Suite
 March Numeric (Movement I)
 Modal Dance (Movement II)
 Fanfare and Chant (Movement III)
 Happy Birthday (Melody Mine)
 Herndon Exaltations (A Celebration of Excellence)
 Hymnsong Variants
 Incantations
 Inchon
 Into the Storm 
 Invincible
 Ireland: Of Legend and Lore
 Jefferson: A Vision for America
 Jingle Bells Forever
 Journeys in Time
 King of Kings
 Knights of the Royal Realm
 Kronos
 Latin Bell Carol
 Legacy
 Legend of the Queen Anne's Revenge
 Liturgical Fanfare
 Lullaby for Band

 March of the Magical Toys
 Mekong
 Mirages
 Montevista
 Monument 
 To Touch the Sky
 Cloud Dances 
 Colorado Dreams
 Pioneer Spirit and Celebration
 Morpheus
 Moto Continuo
 Mystere
 Mysterioso
 Navarro
 Nocturnal Dances
 Northwoods: Of Might and Mettle
 On Eagle's Wings
 On the Rising Winds
 Patriots on Parade
 Portsmouth Overture
 Prevailing Winds
 Procession of Heroes w/Michael Story
 Proclamation
 Proclamation and Procession
 Prologue w/Michael Story
 Promising Skies
 Provenance
 Push
 Quintilian
 Racing the Yankee Clipper
 Relativo
 Reign
 Repercussions
 Rising Dragons
 Rites of Tamburo
 Robin Hood and the Golden Arrow
 Rockin' Ol' St. Nick w/Michael Story
 Rythmos
 Santa's Wild Ride
 Screamin'
 Semper Liberi (We Will Always Be Free)
 Sensei's Ride On The Cherry Blossom Express
 Serengeti Dreams
 Soaring through Ionian Skies
 Solaris
 Songs of Earth, Water, Fire, and Sky
 Songs of Sailor and Sea
 Spirit of the Winds
 Stone Gardens
 Suite of Appalachian Folk Songs
 Surge
 Swarm
 Swing!
 Symphonic Band Clinic
 Symphonic Festival
 Symphonic Statement
 Tangents for Strings
 Tanoan Echoes
 Tap Roots
 Teutonic Tales (Suite for tuba solo with piano accompaniment)
  Demon Dance
 Freya
 Thor's Hammer
 The Children's Carols
 The Hunt With Belle Meade
 The Gathering of the Yeomen
 The Great Locomotive Chase 
 The Great Steamboat Race
 The Maelstrom
 The Magic In Your Eyes
 The Phantom Herd Across The Western Sky
 The Recession Depression Holiday Blues
 The Runaway Sleigh
 The Second Storm
 The Sound and the Fury
 The Spirit of Orpheus
 The Star of Dreams
 The Swarm (A Battle Won With Hornets)
 The Sword of Kings
 The Symphony of Souls
 The Trail of Dreams
 The Tempest
 The Willson Suite
 Tronad (Movement I)
 In a Gentle Rain (Movement II) (also published separately)
 Hurricane (Movement III)
 Three Faces of Kilimanjaro (Kibo, Mawenzi, and Shira)
 Three Fanfares for a Celebration
 Celebrations Fanfare
 Festive Fanfare
 Dedicatory Fanfare
 Through the Vulcan's Eye
 To Challenge the Sky and Heavens Above
 To Conquer The Kraken
 To Dance in the Fields of Glory
 To Dance in the Secret Garden
 To The Max (On The Truck)
 To the Summit! (Strive for the Highest)
 Triton Fanfare
 Tromba Grande
 'Twas in the Moon of Wintertime'
 Twelve Seconds to the Moon
 Twilight Is Falling
 Ultimatum
 Valiance (A Heroic Overture for Band)
 Variant on an Old English Carol
 Vaughan Williams Suite
 Wassail (Movement I)
 Greensleeves: A Fantasia for Band (Movement II)
 Declaration and Flourish (Movement III)
 Warm-Ups for Outdoor Winds and Percussion
 When Summer Takes Flight
 Where the Black Hawk Soars
 Yes, Virginia, There Is A Santa Claus

References

External links

 Biography from Troy University
 Official page at C. L. Barnhouse Co.

American male composers
21st-century American composers
People from Daleville, Alabama
1958 births
Living people
21st-century American male musicians